is a 2001 Japanese animated drama film co-written and directed by Satoshi Kon and produced by Madhouse. Loosely based on the lives of actresses Setsuko Hara and Hideko Takamine, it tells the story of two documentary filmmakers investigating the life of a retired acting legend. As she tells them the story of her life, the borderline between cinema and reality gradually becomes blurred.

Plot

Ginei Studios, a prestigious but bankrupt film studio, goes out of business. Television interviewer Genya Tachibana and his cameraman Kyoji Ida prepare for a retrospective interview with Chiyoko Fujiwara, the studio's best known star, who thirty years prior retired from acting and became a recluse. When they meet, Tachibana gives Chiyoko a key he believes she lost at the studio, prompting her to reflect on her life.

As Chiyoko begins, the film becomes a surreal story within a story wherein events from Chiyoko's life are interwoven with scenes from films she has appeared in, while Tachibana and Ida appear within them as documentary filmmakers. As a teenager, she was given the key by an artist and political dissident opposing the Sino-Japanese War. She helped him escape from the authorities and after his departure, decided to become a film actress in the hope that he would recognize and find her. Her quest continues for decades and Chiyoko becomes famous, acting in films ranging from jidaigeki to kaiju. Despite not hearing from the mysterious artist, she never loses hope.

Chiyoko loses the key one day during filming and resigns to marrying Junichi Ōtaki, a director at the studio. Years later, Chiyoko finds the key hidden in their home and confronts her husband about it; former lead actress Eiko Shimao reveals that she stole it out of jealousy and gave it to Junichi. One day, the former military policeman who had been pursuing the artist comes to Chiyoko to atone for his sins during the war, and gives her a letter from the artist. He tells Tachibana, who was working as a studio assistant at the time, that the artist was tortured and killed after his arrest. Though she does not receive this information, Chiyoko abandons her search for the artist, accepting that she is no longer the girl the artist once knew.

In the present, an earthquake strikes during the interview, upsetting Chiyoko's fragile health. On her hospital deathbed she reflects on her life, telling Tachibana that despite never seeing the man again, she realized that the search for him was what she loved most.

Cast

Production
Millennium Actress is the second film directed by Satoshi Kon and his first original work, after the highly acclaimed Perfect Blue.
It was planned by Masao Maruyama and produced by Taro Maki.

Following the release of Perfect Blue, Kon considered adapting the Yasutaka Tsutsui novel Paprika (1993) into his next film. 
However, these plans were stalled when the distribution company for Perfect Blue, Rex Entertainment, went bankrupt.

The project for Millennium Actress came from the words "Let's make a movie that looks like a trompe l'oeil" by Taro Maki, who decided to produce Kon's film because he thought his previous work was amazing.
The script writing began with a sentence that Kon came up with: "An old woman who was once touted as a great actress is supposed to be recounting her life story, but her memories get confused and the various roles she played in the past begin to blend into it, creating a tumultuous story."
The structure of the story was decided at the rough plot stage when Kon fleshed out this sentence, and the last scene remained intact in the finished film.
He then worked with the scenario writer, Sadayuki Murai, and the producer to develop the episodes and detailed character settings to be included in the plot.

Unlike the previous film, which he was hired to direct, this one was his original project, so he was able to express his own opinions, and decided to put more emphasis on the sound, especially the music, and asked Susumu Hirasawa, who had been adored for a long time, to compose the music.
There were about 250 staff members in total, and the production period was about two years. The 20 or so main staff members were almost the same as in the previous work, with only the animation director changing.
In the previous work, the character design was done by Hisashi Eguchi and the animation director by Hideki Hamasu, but in this work, both were done by Takeshi Honda.
The reason for this is that the animation director is a very important and burdensome position, and the animators who have the skills and abilities that Kon would like to work with are usually those prefer to draw key frames rather than the animation director, making it difficult to ask them to continue their work.
For the character designs, Honda was chosen because he is someone who draws elegant pictures that ordinary people don't frown upon and is genuinely talented in the animation industry, in order to make sure that the movie would not end up being just for a few animation fans just because it is an animation movie.
Some of the character designs were done by Kon himself, and all the posters of Chiyoko in the movie were also drawn by Kon.

This is Kon's last traditional animation, as his later works were digital animations. And most of the scenes are drawn based on Kon's layout.

The budget was initially 130 million yen, and the final budget was around 100 million and a few tens of millions of yen, one of the lowest production costs for an animated film in Japan.

Release
The film was released in North America on September 12, 2003, distributed by DreamWorks' arthouse and foreign movie publishing company Go Fish Pictures, with a total of six screens.

Theatrical anime distribution company Eleven Arts acquired the North American rights and re-released the film theatrically in its original Japanese language version on August 13, 2019 and in an all-new English dubbed version on August 19, 2019.

Box office
Commercially, the film performed modestly on its US release earning $18,732 on its opening weekend and $37,285 during its full three-week release. The film was shown almost exclusively in New York and Los Angeles and received a minimal advertising campaign from Go Fish Pictures, a division of DreamWorks SKG.
Although the scale of the release was not large, the merit of the theatrical release was not only in the box-office revenue, but also in the fact that critics would view the film and publish reviews and criticisms in general newspapers, magazines and websites, which would raise awareness of the work and reach a wider audience than just anime fans.

Theme 
Millennium Actress began with a request to make a trompe l'oeil movie like the previous Perfect Blue. However, it was only a film technique, not a film theme. Both works share the same methodology of "blurring the boundary between fiction and reality," and both works are like two sides of the same coin for Kon.
The previous film focused on the negative side of human nature, while this film focuses on the positive side.
The previous film depicted the gradual blurring of the boundary between fiction and reality, while this film seamlessly connects fiction and reality from the beginning, and shows the characters freely moving back and forth between fiction and reality.
The technique of mixing fiction and reality was used to express the protagonist's uneasy inner world in the previous film, and used in this film for a fun adventure, turning the film from psycho-horror and suspense to a tricky and humorous entertainment.

In the previous film, he tried to confuse the audience by depicting the inner turmoil and chaos of the main character through the mixture of fiction and reality, but in this film, his intention is not to confuse the audience, but to let the audience enjoy the mixture of fiction and reality itself.
He aimed to create a film a kind of The Adventures of Old Lady Blowing Smoke by mixing fiction and reality to the point where it becomes meaningless to distinguish between them.

There are various kinds of trompe l'oeil paintings, but one example that Kon gave to the staff was Utagawa Kuniyoshi's ukiyoe "At first glance he looks very fierce, but he is actually a kind person" (みかけハこハゐがとんだいゝ人だ). At first glance, it appears to be the face of a single person, but upon closer inspection, one can see that many people are intertwined, and he likened this characteristic of the painting, "non-faces coming together to form a face," to the concept of this work, "lies piling up to reveal the truth.

The film has a complex structure in which the staff members who visit the legendary actress for an interview experience her life story in a fictional world where the actress' past and the movies she appeared in intersect, making the story a mixture of reality and fiction as well as a tribute to various classic movies.
The main character is modeled on Setsuko Hara and Hideko Takamine, and the movies that appear in the film include a period piece in the style of Akira Kurosawa's Throne of Blood, a film by Yasujiro Ozu, a chanbara (sword fighting) story featuring Kurama Tengu, a monster story that borrows images from Godzilla, and a science fiction story.

The story follows the personal story of Chiyoko Fujiwara, an elderly actress, and gradually becomes a muddle of reality, dreams, and movies. Each episode repeats a series of scenes of "chasing, running, and falling" in different situations and times. Her life, the sum of all of these, also repeats various setbacks and revivals while continuing to chase after Man with Key, who is almost an illusion.
This work is basically a repetition of the same episode, a cyclical story like Boléro in music.
Kon said that this idea of a fractal structure owes a lot to the music of Susumu Hirasawa.
The story also reflects the hospitalization Kon experienced after his debut as a manga artist, and the frustration and struggle he felt at that time: "Everything is ruined, but can I still make a comeback?"
This film is famous for making many audiences feel betrayed by Chiyoko's last line. Kon said that the process of human growth is a repetition of death and rebirth, in which the values we have accumulated up to that point become unacceptable in a new phase, and even if we rebuild them once they are broken, they become unacceptable again in a new phase, and he involved the audience in the fractal of the film by asking them whether they would be able to get up and continue to "chase, run, and fall" even after they "fell" at the end of the film.

Kon said, "There is no single solution - that's what I want most for my work to be. I want people to see it in many different ways."

Critical reception
Millennium Actress was favorably received by critics, gaining a 93% "fresh" rating at Rotten Tomatoes. Los Angeles Times critic Kenneth Turan said of the film "as a rumination on the place movies have in our personal and collective subconscious, Millennium Actress fascinatingly goes where films have not often gone before". Kevin M. Williams of the Chicago Tribune gave the movie 4 stars and put his feelings for the film this way: "A piece of cinematic art. It’s modern day Japanese animation at its best […] It's animated, but it's human and will touch the soul of anyone who has loved deeply". In February 2004, Cinefantastique listed the anime as one of the "10 Essential Animations", stating that it "represents a new maturity for anime, one where the technical achievements of 40 years are finally put at the full service of an emotionally rich story."

Awards
Millennium Actress received the Grand Prize in the Japan Agency of Cultural Affairs Media Arts Festival, tying with Spirited Away. Additionally, it won the awards of Best Animation Film and Fantasia Ground-Breaker at the 2001 Fantasia Film Festival. It was awarded the Feature Film Award at the 8th Animation Kobe. The movie took home the prestigious Ofuji Noburo Award at the 2002 Mainichi Film Awards, and was honored with the Orient Express Award at the 2001 Festival de Cine de Sitges in Spain. The film was nominated for four Annie Awards in 2004, including Outstanding Direction and Writing. It was also promoted by its studio as a contender for the 2003 Academy Award for Best Animated Feature, but it was not nominated.

References

External links
 
 Official soundtrack page
 
 
 

2001 anime films
Anime with original screenplays
Drama anime and manga
Fantasy anime and manga
Magic realism films
Metafictional works
Self-reflexive films
Theatre in anime and manga
Films about actors
Films about film directors and producers
Films directed by Satoshi Kon
Madhouse (company)
Romance anime and manga
Japanese animated films
2001 fantasy films
Bandai Visual